Lina Bennani (born 4 July 1991) is a Moroccan former professional tennis player.

Born in Casablanca, Bennani participated in six Fed Cup ties for Morocco between 2008 and 2011, mostly as a doubles player. She won her only singles rubber, over Malta's Elaine Genovese in 2010.

Bennani, who won three ITF doubles titles, competed in the main draw of her home WTA Tour tournament, the Morocco Open, once in singles and four times in doubles.

At the 2011 Pan Arab Games in Doha, Bennani won bronze medals in the singles and team events for Morocco.

ITF finals

Doubles: 4 (3–1)

References

External links
 
 
 

1991 births
Living people
Moroccan female tennis players
Sportspeople from Casablanca
21st-century Moroccan women